Temein, also known as Ron(g)e, is an Eastern Sudanic language spoken by the Temein people of the Nuba Hills in Sudan.

Ronge is an approximation of the endonym.

Temein is spoken in Farik, Kuris, Kwiye, Nekring, Tokoing, Tukur, and Tulu villages (Ethnologue, 22nd edition).

References

Temein language (Roger Blench 2007)

External links
 Temein basic lexicon at the Global Lexicostatistical Database

Severely endangered languages
Temein languages